Shannon Wright (born 20 January 1994) is an American cartoonist and illustrator from Massaponax, Virginia who is known for her political, feminist, and racial discussion in her work of arts.

Early life 
Shannon Wright grew up in Virginia, and shared many interests with her brothers, Kevin II and Travis, due to her status as the only girl among the siblings. She cites this as an original reason she was exposed to anime and cartoons so extensively as a child. When deciding on which college to attend, Wright was denied from the Governor's School for the Arts; this was an obstacle, along with others such as finances, gender and race.

She graduated from Virginia Commonwealth University (VCU) with a degree in communication arts in 2016.

Career 
After graduating in 2016, Wright became known for her illustrative political statements and representations of the black community. She has made work for companies including TIME, BBC,  The Guardian, Bitch Media,  Boom Studios, The New York Times, Eater, The Baffler, The Nib,  and Mother Jones. Wright was the Editor-in-Chief for the VCU comics anthology, Emanata, and an illustration editor for The Commonwealth Times.

Wright's artistic representations range from the depiction of natural black hair and traditional hairstyles to responses of the black community to Donald Trump's rhetoric. Wright's illustrations originated from an assignment to illustrate the meaning of being a knight; she created a black female warrior with Bantu knots. 

Her comic 'Eight Ways to Resist Donald Trump' catalogues a response to the Trump presidency, with an emphasis on unity, wellness, and resistance. While Wright does catalogue much social commentary in these areas, she also supports causes such as environmentalism, as seen in "Hate Mowing Your Lawn? Good! Don't Do It". 

In 2016, Wright contributed to Bitch Media's group show, No Feminism, No Future.

Artistic themes 
Illustrative themes in Wright's works include intersectional feminism, politics, and environmental issues. She also illustrates images to accompany texts discussing cultural issues such as racism in politics and technology, lack of access to medical resources in the black community, and gentrification of black neighborhoods.

Illustrated works 
 Betty Before X by Ilyasah Shabazz; book cover illustration by Wright 
 Kaboom Adventure Time #57 comics cover for Boom Studios
My Mommy Medicine. Written by Edwidge Danticat; picture book illustration. Roaring Brook Press, 2019.

Awards 
 2015: Certificate of Merit from the Virginia Press Association in illustration
 2016: Bobbi Braun Award from the Society of Illustrators

References 

1994 births
Living people
American women illustrators
American illustrators
Virginia Commonwealth University alumni
21st-century American women artists